Joe and Caspar Hit the Road is a 2015 British comedy documentary film directed by Brian Klein and starring British YouTubers Caspar Lee and Joe Sugg.

The film follows Lee and Sugg (playing fictionalised versions of themselves) going on a road trip around Europe without any electronics or money. The couple take up a number of jobs, including learning to be gondoliers in Venice, working as deckhands on a super yacht in Antibes, working at Italian football club AC Milan and performing on Barcelona's Las Ramblas.

Release
Distribution rights to the film were held by BBC Worldwide. The film had its red carpet premiere in their home country, the United Kingdom, at the Empire, Leicester Square on 22 November 2015, a day before it was released on DVD in selected countries. The film was also available on Amazon.com, iTunes, and Tesco.

The film was also shown on British television channel E4, in two parts on 25 April and 1 May 2016.

Sequel
A sequel Joe & Caspar Hit the Road USA was released to DVD in November 2016.

References

External links
 
 Joe and Caspar Hit the Road at Channel 4

2015 films
British documentary films
2015 comedy films
Films shot in Italy
Films shot in France
Films shot in Barcelona
2010s English-language films
2010s British films